A+ Hong Kong Kitchen is a Chinese restaurant in Seattle's Chinatown–International District, in the U.S. state of Washington.

Description 
The Chinese restaurant A+ Hong Kong Kitchen is located in Seattle's Chinatown–International District. The menu has included fish balls in curry, rice with minced pork and salted fish, rice rolls, congee, noodle soups, pork chops and spaghetti, pineapple buns, and tea sandwiches with butter and condensed milk.

History 
Hoi Ning Chim manages the restaurant as of 2022.

Reception 

Seattle Metropolitan has said "just about every dish is fabulous". The magazine's Allecia Vermillion and Rosin Saez included the business in a 2019 list of "The Best Restaurants in Chinatown Right Now". In 2022, Seattle Metropolitan staff named A+ Hong Kong a "best lunch spot" in Central Seattle, and Hsiao-Ching Chou and Vermillion included the business in an overview of "Our Very Favorite Chinese Restaurants".

Callie Craighead included A+ Hong Kong in the Seattle Post-Intelligencer 2020 list of "10 top-rated Chinese restaurants in Seattle's International District, according to Yelp". In 2022, Zuri Anderson of iHeart said the restaurant offers Washington's best Chinese take-out. Aimee Rizzo and Carlo Mantuano included A+ Hong Kong in The Infatuation's 2022 list of "The Best Restaurants in the International District". Caitlin Flynn selected the restaurant for Washington in Eat This, Not That's 2022 overview of "The Best Chinese Takeout in Every State".

In 2022, Jay Friedman included A+ Hong Kong in Eater Seattle list of "19 Knockout Restaurants in Seattle's Chinatown–International District", and he and Jade Yamazaki Stewart included the business in a list of "20 Knockout Chinese and Taiwanese Restaurants in the Seattle Area".

See also 

 List of Chinese restaurants

References

External links
 

Chinatown–International District, Seattle
Chinese restaurants in Seattle